Oberea griseopennis is a species of beetle in the family Cerambycidae. It was described by Bernhard Schwarzer in 1925. It feeds on Cinnamomum camphora.

Subspecies
 Oberea griseopennis ichangensis Breuning, 1969
 Oberea griseopennis chinensis Breuning, 1982
 Oberea griseopennis griseopennis Schwarzer, 1925

References

griseopennis
Beetles described in 1925